Tai Orathai (born March 27, 1980) is a Thai female luk thung (Thai country music) singer from Ubon Ratchatani, Thailand. She is also known as "Sao Dok Yaah (Miss Grass Flower)". The name Sao Dok Yahh comes from her debut album. The album sold more than two million copies in Thailand. She graduated with a bachelor's degree in Faculty of Mass Communication from Ramkhamhaeng University.

Biography

Early life 
Tai's real name is Orathai Dabkham. She was born on 27 March 1980, in the village of Khum San Chani, Tambon Pohn Swan, Amphoe Na  Chaluai, in the Ubon Ratchatani Province. She is the daughter of Sang Dabhkam and Nittaya Kaewthong. Her parents separated when she was 11 years old. She then lived with her grandmother, Khun Yai Thongkham Kaewthong. She has three younger siblings, whom she helped raise with her grandmother.

Studio albums

Special albums

Filmography

TV Series

Other songs
 โปงลางอีนางเด้อ (Pong Lang Ee Nang Der)
 โลโซโบว์รัก (Lo So Bow Luk)
 เอียงแก้มคอย (Iong Gam Koy)

References

External links 
 
 
 
 
 Tai Orathai ที่ Google

Tai Orathai
Tai Orathai
Living people
1980 births
Tai Orathai
Lao-language singers
Isan-language singers